Gaetbulibacter marinus is a Gram-negative, rod-shaped, strictly aerobic, chemoheterotrophic and non-motile bacterium from the genus of Gaetbulibacter which has been isolated from surface seawater from the coast of the Yellow Sea in Korea.

References

Flavobacteria
Bacteria described in 2008